Gong Gam Gong Geo is a 1964 Khmer film directed by Biv Chai Leang starring Chea Yuthon and rising actress Y Kim Sua.

Cast 
Chea Yuthon
Y Kim Sua
 Kim Nova

Release 
Y Kim Sua died while making this film. Due to her eye tragedy after performing a scene in the movie, this film was never released; But instead, it was completed as a novel while the film was used as an archive.

Soundtrack

Remakes 
This film has been remade in 2004. The latest version of this film, released in 2004, stars Eng Rithy and Keo Pich Pisey.

Sources 
 

1964 films
Cambodian drama films